The  is a bureau of the Japan's National Police Agency in charge of national-level internal security affairs. It supervises the Security Bureau and the Public Security Bureau of the Tokyo Metropolitan Police Department, and Security departments of other Prefectural police headquarters for those issues.

The NPA SB is currently being commanded by Kazuya Hara.

Organization 
Organization of the Security Bureau is as follows:

Security Department
The  is charged with internal counter-terrorism, countering cybercrime and surveillance of potentially threatening groups, organisations, and social phenomena: It's also tasked with providing close protection requirements to VIPs.
 
 Security Coordination Office
 Image Data Analysis Office
 Intelligence Coordination Analysis Office
 Crisis Management Office
 Cyber Attack Analysis Center
 
 Intelligence Countermeasure Office
 Far-Left Countermeasure Office
 Far-Right Countermeasure Office
 Special Organized Crime Countermeasure Office

Foreign Affairs and Intelligence Department 
The  is charged with counter-intelligence, and international counter-terrorism:
 
 Foreign Affairs Technical Investigation Office
 Foreign Affairs Research Office
 Foreign Affairs Special Case Countermeasure Office
 Unauthorized Export Countermeasure Office
 
 Counter International Terrorism Countermeasure Office

Security Operations Department 
The  replaced the former  in 2019. It's mandated with security and protecting VIPs (1st Division) and response to large-scale disaster or terrorism (2nd Division).

Training
Prospective SB officers are trained at the National Police Academy in intelligence gathering techniques.

References

Bibliography

 

Domestic intelligence agencies
Japanese intelligence agencies
Police units of the National Police Agency (Japan)